Carmen Haderer is an Austrian Paralympic alpine skier. She represented Austria in Paralympic alpine skiing at the 1992 Paralympic Winter Games in Albertville and 1994 Paralympic Winter Games  in Lillehammer, where she won a bronze medal .

Career 
At the 1992 Winter Paralympics, in Albertville, France, Haderer finished fifth in the slalom  LW3,4,9 event (with a time of 1:34.47), and in the super-G  LW3,4,9 (time 1:26.23). In the giant slalom  LW3,4,9 , however, Haderer did not achieve remarkable results.

At the 1994 Paralympic Winter Games, in Lillehammer, Norway, Haderer finished 3rd in the LW3/4 slalom event, with a time of 2:15.84. On the podium was Reinhild Moeller , with gold in 1:43.07 and Lana Spreeman , with silver in 1:54.54 ).  Haderer also competed in the super-G category LW3/4 (placed fifth with 1:33.50, behind Reinhild Möller, Renate Hjortland, Lana Spreeman and Susanne Redel), and in the giant slalom.

References 

Paralympic bronze medalists for Austria
Living people
Paralympic alpine skiers of Austria
Year of birth missing (living people)